Eugène Auguste François Deully (1860–1933) was a French painter of genre scenes and figures.

Life 
Deully was born in Lille on 16 November 1860. He studied in Paris at the École nationale supérieure des arts décoratifs and the École nationale supérieure des Beaux-Arts, and under Jean Léon Gérôme, Auguste Barthélemy Glaize and Léon Glaize.

He initially painted symbolist, religious and mythological subjects; later, he produced numerous portraits and genre scenes. He exhibited from 1887 at the Paris Salon, winning an award with merit in 1888, a third-class medal in 1889, and a first-class medal in 1892. He exhibited at the 1900 Exposition Universelle in Paris, where he won a bronze medal.

Deully received a travel bursary in 1892 to visit Italy, the Netherlands and Belgium. He was then the drawing teacher at the Collège Sainte-Barbe for a time. From 1897 to 1912 he was chief conservator at the Musée des Beaux-Arts de Lille. He was made an Officer of the Legion of Honour in 1927.

He died at his home in the 14th arrondissement of Paris on 6 December 1933.

Collections 
 Musée des Beaux-Arts de Tourcoing: Les Tourments de Saint Jérôme ('The Torments of Saint Jerome'), 1889;
 Musée de la Chartreuse de Douai: Orphée ('Orpheus'), 1892;
 Musée des Beaux-Arts de Dunkerque: Pommiers en fleurs ('Apple Blossoms'), 1913;
 Musée de l'hôtel Sandelin: Portrait de Jean-Pierre, baron du Teil (after Alfred de Jaubert, Musée Versailles).

Citations

General and cited references 
 "1933, Décès. 14D 391 (17/31)". Archives de Paris. (n.d.). Retrieved 24 April 2022.
 Lobstein, Dominique (2021). "Deully, Eugène-Auguste-François". In Andreas Beyer, Bénédicte Savoy and Wolf Tegethoff (eds.). Allgemeines Künstlerlexikon. Berlin, New York: K. G. Saur. De Gruyter.
 Oliver, Valerie Cassel, ed. (2011). "Deully, Eugène Auguste François". In Benezit Dictionary of Artists. Oxford Art Online.
 Thieme, Ulrich, ed. (1913). "Deully, Eugène Auguste Françoi". In Allgemeines Lexikon der Bildenden Künstler von der Antike bis zur Gegenwart, Vol. 9: Delaulne–Dubois. Leipzig: E. A. Seemann. p. 168.

Further reading 
 Édouard-Joseph, René (1930). Dictionnaire biographique des artistes contemporains, Vol. 1: A–E. Paris: Art & Édition. pp. 405–406.
 Exposition du peintre Eugène Deully, hors concours, chevalier de la Légion d'honneur, officier de l'ordre de Léopold de Belgique. Société anonyme, 1925.

External links 
 

1860 births
1933 deaths
19th-century French painters
20th-century French painters
Officiers of the Légion d'honneur